Bilari is a city and a municipal board in Moradabad district in the state of Uttar Pradesh, India. It is connected by road as well as Indian Railways.

Demographics
As of the 2001 Census of India, Bilari has a population of 30,246, of whom 15,992 are males and 14,254 are females. Children aged less than or equal to six years total 5,229, of which 2,697 are males and 2,532 are females. 13,520 of the population are literate, of which 8,156 are males and 5,364 female.

Schools
 Anwar Inter college, Mudiya Raja
 Azad Public Higher Secondary School Bilari
 Mind’s Eye International School
 Azad Public School Bilari.
 B H P Memorial Inter College Bilari
 Dr D P S Vidha Mandir Inter-College
 HSA Inter-College
Janta Inter-College
PCS Vidya Mandir
HQM Public School
Rani Pritam Kunwar School 
Ram Ratan Inter College
Shri Manmohan Singh Vaidhji Public School
Shankar Sahai Har Sahai Girls Inter-College
Silver Oak Academy
Ch. Gyan Singh Krishak Higher Secondary School, Station Road Bilari 
SBS School
Kamlanand Saraswati Vidhya Mandir
 De Paul school
 R.P.V.M Inter College
 Anand Saraswati Vidhya Mandir, Mill

Degree College
Royal Degree College
Gramodaya Mahavidhyalya
Hari Mangal Mahavidhyalya
M.H.Memorial Degree College
Jevan Lakshya Degree College

Printing Press & Cyber Cafe
 Dinesh Printing Press
 Gul Printers
 Ashu CSC & Cyber Cafe
 SP common Service centre Dhakia naroo
 Manyawar Shri Kanshiram Ji CSC Station Road Bilari

References

Cities and towns in Moradabad district